W258CB (99.5 FM) is a radio station translator in Greenville, South Carolina. Owned by Tower Above Media, the station simulcasts a classic hits music format branded as Awesome 99.5 from an HD Radio subchannel of SummitMedia's WJMZ-FM.

History
W258CB began broadcasting at 97.7 FM as W249CB in December 2007 in Six Mile, re-broadcasting WLFJ-FM HD-3, which in turn was a simulcast of WHRZ-LP in Spartanburg, which carried a Christian Contemporary format. In August 2011, the station filed an application to move to Paris Mountain in Greenville, with an upgrade from 190 watts to 250 watts, allowing the station to cover Greenville County, as well as portions of neighboring Pickens and Spartanburg counties. The new location and stronger signal gave the station an impressive coverage area for a translator, helped by the location of the antenna on a mountain. After the request was granted, construction began on the new transmitter site in Greenville. The move was made official in early 2012.

On December 16, 2011, the station began operating from the new site under a construction permit. The religious format, however, did not move with the signal; on that day, 97.7 FM signed on with a variety hits format known as 97.7 Chuck FM, simulcast from an HD Radio subchannel of Cox Media Group-owned WJMZ-FM.

On July 20, 2012, Cox Radio announced the sale of its mid-market stations, including WJMZ and its lease of W249CB, to SummitMedia $66.25 million. The sale was consummated on May 3, 2013.

On August 19, 2016, the translator moved to 99.5 FM. The translator changed its call sign to W258CB on August 30, 2016. On December 27, 2017, the station relaunched under the Jack FM brand, with no change in format.

On June 1, 2021 W258CB shifted its format from adult hits to classic hits as Awesome 99.5.

References

External links

258CB
Classic hits radio stations in the United States
Radio stations established in 2007
2007 establishments in South Carolina